The Toney-Standley House in or near Fort Gaines, Georgia, United States, was built in c.1810.  It was listed on the National Register of Historic Places in 1974.  It has also been known as Col. William Toney House.

It is a Plantation Plain style house which was home of Creek Indian tradepost manager William Toney, significant partly as Aaron Burr stayed there, after his capture in 1807.

References

Houses on the National Register of Historic Places in Georgia (U.S. state)
Houses completed in 1810
National Register of Historic Places in Clay County, Georgia